Gregory Thomas "Moe" Mulleavy (September 25, 1905 – February 1, 1980) was an American professional baseball shortstop, manager, coach, and scout. 

Born in Detroit, Michigan, his father, Thomas, was a machinist in a Detroit automobile factory, having moved from Canada to the United States in 1903 with his wife, Bertha (Freytag) Mulleavy. Gregory was born on September 25, 1905, their elder child. A daughter, Eleanor, was later born. He attended the University of Detroit Jesuit High School and Academy prior to beginning his baseball career in 1927.

Playing career

He played 79 games in Major League Baseball (MLB) for the Chicago White Sox and Boston Red Sox. His 76 big-league hits included 14 doubles and five triples. Mulleavy's minor league playing career lasted 20 seasons (1927–46), the last six as a playing manager.

Coach and manager
He joined the Brooklyn Dodgers organization in 1946 and became a longtime member of the Dodger system in both Brooklyn and Los Angeles. Mulleavy managed the Triple-A Montreal Royals for the full seasons of 1955–56 and through the mid-season of 1957. On June 14, he was reassigned to the Major League coaching staff of the Brooklyn Dodgers, and he remained as an aide to Walter Alston after the franchise moved West (1958–60; 1962–64). He served on two world champions for Los Angeles (1959; 1963). Mulleavy was a scout for the Dodgers from 1950 to 1954, in 1961, and from 1965 until his death in 1980.

Family
He married Doris Giroux in 1932. In 1939, their son Greg Mullavey(Gregory Thomas Mulleavy Jr.) who became an actor was born.and is best known for his leading role in the TV sitcom Mary Hartman, Mary Hartman. He changed the spelling of his surname so as not to be confused with his father.

References

External links

1905 births
1980 deaths
Baseball coaches from Michigan
Baseball players from Detroit
Boston Red Sox players
Brooklyn Dodgers coaches
Brooklyn Dodgers scouts
Buffalo Bisons (minor league) managers
Buffalo Bisons (minor league) players
Chicago White Sox players
Decatur Commodores players
Jamestown Falcons players
Lockport Cubs players
Lockport White Sox players
Los Angeles Dodgers coaches
Los Angeles Dodgers scouts
Major League Baseball bullpen coaches
Major League Baseball first base coaches
Major League Baseball shortstops
Montreal Royals managers
Oakland Oaks (baseball) players
Olean Oilers players
Petersburg Broncos players
Raleigh Capitals players
San Antonio Indians players
Toledo Mud Hens managers
Toledo Mud Hens players